Maya Eshet  (born ) is an Israeli actress, known for Shiur Moledet: Avdei Hashem (2003), Teen Wolf (2011), and To The Bone (2017).

Early life
Eshet was born in Jerusalem, Israel, to a family of Ashkenazi Jewish descent. Her mother Ilva ( Gurevich) immigrated to Israel from Sweden. Her father is Arik Eshet, and both her parents are voice actors and acting coaches. She has two younger sisters, one of whom is Israeli actress Mili Eshet. She grew up in moshav Mesilat Zion, Israel.

Personal life
She is married to American actor Konstantin Melikhov, whom she met during her acting studies in New York.

Filmography

Film

Television

Web

Stage

Music videos

References

External links
  
  
 Maya Eshet at IsraelFilmCenter.org

Living people
Israeli child actresses
Israeli film actresses
Israeli stage actresses
Israeli television actresses
Israeli voice actresses
Jewish Israeli actresses
Stella Adler Studio of Acting alumni
1990 births
21st-century Israeli actresses
Actresses from Jerusalem
Israeli Ashkenazi Jews